myNEWS.com is a home grown press and retail convenience chain located in Malaysia. Since its inception in 1997, myNEWS.com has evolved from a single news stand to the largest home grown retail convenience store chain in Malaysia. Founded by Dang Tai Luk, its first flagship store opened on 25 December 1996. As of Year 2021, myNEWS.com has more than 452 outlets, the majority of them are located in the urban areas of Peninsular Malaysia. It currently serves over 2.5 million customers monthly and has more than 1600 employees.

History 

On 25 December 1996, the first newsstand outlet called MAGBIT in 1 Utama Shopping Centre was established by Dang Tai Luk and his wife Ling Chao. The evolution commenced in 1997 with the launch of the "myNEWS.com" brand name, riding on the ".com" wave then, with the opening of the first myNEWS.com outlet in Mid Valley Megamall. Then, a company called Bison Stores Sdn Bhd was formed with plans to manage and expand myNEWS.com outlets across Malaysia. Bison started predominantly as a print media retailer and evolved to become a press and retail convenience outlet chain. Gradually progressing in the early stages, Bison Stores Sdn Bhd managed to open 10 outlets after three years in operation and achieved its 100th outlet opening in 2007, 200th outlet in 2014, and its 300th outlet in 2016. As the number of outlet grew, there was a shift in operations. Unlike the industry norm going through middle men in the form of distributors, Bison Stores went directly to many of the largest publishing houses in Malaysia to source for printed products. As parts of their service to publishers, a sales reporting system was customised to offer a better efficiency rate and provide timely market insights and movement of products.

In 2012, the joint venture between myNEWS and WH Smith Travel Limited, a renowned convenience store operator specialised in travel accessories, to set up WH Smith Malaysia Sdn Bhd has testified the acceptance and recognition of the myNEWS.com name abroad. The licensing of the myNEWS.com brand name to two (2) outlets at the Yangon International Airport in Myanmar in May 2016 further affirmed the recognition bestowed on myNEWS.

On 2 October 2017, Bison Stores Sdn Bhd changed its company's name to Mynews Retail Sdn Bhd. The new company's name allows them to incorporate "myNEWS.com" brand recognition into its business entities. myNEWS is today a recognised player in the convenience stores sector and is a renowned brand, both locally and abroad.

Parent company 
As the largest homegrown press and retail convenience chain in Malaysia, myNEWS.com is one of the subsidiaries owned and operated by Bison Consolidated Berhad. On 26 March 2013, Bison Consolidated Berhad incorporated as Prempac Sdn Bhd, a private limited company. It changed its name to Bison Consolidated Sdn Bhd on 25 September 2014, and on 16 July 2015, it converted into a public company and assumed the name, Bison Consolidated Berhad. The company was listed on the Main Market of Bursa Malaysia Securities Berhad ("Bursa Malaysia") on 29 March 2016. The company also operates a bakery which supplies solely to myNEWS.com outlet and the information technology systems used by myNEWS.com are from its own development.

Bison, during initial public offering (IPO), had envisioned to develop its own food preparation and packaging facility. On 5 October 2017, Bison Consolidated Berhad entered into two separate Joint Venture Agreements (JVA) for its food preparation and packaging facility in Rawang, Selangor to develop, produce and sell ready to eat (RTE) food and bakery products. The first JVA was signed between Mynews Food and Gourmet Kineya Co. Ltd and the second JVA was signed between Mynews Food and MRA Bakery Sdn Bhd. These joint ventures with partners, principally GK and Ryoyupan who are renowned experts in their respective fields has changed the magnitude and timeline for myNEWS to achieve its objective of offering great quality RTE food at affordable prices to the Malaysian consumers.

On 11 December 2017, Bison Consolidated Berhad changed its name to Mynews Holdings Berhad.

myNEWS has been operating the press and retail convenience business for twenty (20) years under the respective companies managed by the same management team and led by common directors in their respective Board.

Products and services 

myNEWS.com outlets carry products ranging from a large selection of magazines to convenience products such as household items, food and beverage, tobacco, personal hygiene and pharmaceutical products, snacks and drinks that includes its co-propriety brand of natural mineral water with Dasani. It also offers a variety of services available at selected outlets including prepaid top-up for mobile service providers, Touch ‘n Go reloads, bill payments, money remittance services and automated teller machines, photocopying, money changing agent to Western Union and Travelex, as well as courier services.

Outlets 
Market shopping behaviour has changed to favour the locations of modern trade such as shopping malls and hypermarkets as they are more convenient, accessible and appealing to the customers. Shoppers are lured by the locations of the outlets, environment, product display, promotions and the loyalty programs. As such, myNEWS.com was the first to move from the typical newsstand locations to modern trade by positioning themselves in key locations where most of their customers are located. For instance, shopping malls, hypermarkets, offices, hospitals, resorts, theme parks, transportation hubs and airports.

myNEWS currently has over 420 outlets mainly in Peninsular Malaysia and a few in East Malaysia. It is mainly concentrated in the Central region, operating in shopping complexes and business hubs like Mid Valley Megamall, 1 Utama Shopping Centre, Pavilion KL, Suria KLCC, Sunway Pyramid, Setia City Mall, Plaza Sentral, Damansara City Mall, and The Horizon Bangsar South. In other regions, myNEWS also operates outlets in some famous shopping centres, for example Dataran Pahlawan Melaka Megamall, Queensbay Mall, Jusco Tebrau City, Little Red Cube and The Spring. It also has outlets in transportation hubs, such as KLIA, KLIA2, Senai International Airport, Penang International Airport, Langkawi International Airport, and Kota Kinabalu International Airport. myNEWS outlets are also available at rail transport hubs, such as LRT and MRT stations.

Store design
The design for myNEWS.com outlets is modern and contemporary with an emphasis on brightness and airiness.

References

External links 
 
 Official facebook page

1996 establishments in Malaysia
Convenience stores
Malaysian brands
Privately held companies of Malaysia